Kathryn Simmonds (born 1972 Hertfordshire) is a British poet, and short story writer.

Life
She graduated from the University of East Anglia with an MA in Creative Writing.

She has also experimented with playwriting, and her first radio play Poetry for Beginners, a comic drama set on a creative writing residential course, was broadcast on Radio 4 in 2008.

She lives in London, England, and teaches creative writing at the Poetry School and Morley College.

Awards
 2002 Eric Gregory Award, from the Society of Authors
 2004 Poetry Business competition 
 2006 Poetry London competition
 2007 Asham Award shortlisted for "Pentecost"
 2008 Forward Poetry Prize Best First Collection
 2008 Guardian First Book Award, longlisted
 2008 Costa Book Awards, nominated Poetry category

Works

Poetry collections
 Snug, Smith/Doorstop 2004
 Sunday at the Skin Launderette, Seren 2008
 The Visitations, Seren 2013

Novels
 Love and Fallout, Seren 2014

References

External links
 Profile and poems at The Poetry Archive, 2009 
 Seren Books profile
 University of East Anglia profile
 Simmonds poems featured in The Guardian, 29 August 2008
 Wigtown Poetry Prize. Simmonds profile
 "Winter Morning" and "The Woman Who Worried Herself To Death". The Poem 2007

Short Stories
 "The Chest", Barcelona Review, 2009
 "This Little Piggy", Barcelona Review, 2004
 "A Quiet Drink", Barcelona Review, 2006

1972 births
Living people
English women poets
Alumni of the University of East Anglia
21st-century British poets
21st-century English women writers